Maury Alan Chaykin (July 27, 1949 – July 27, 2010) was an American–Canadian actor, best known for his portrayal of detective Nero Wolfe, as well as for his work as a character actor in many films and television programs.

Personal life
Chaykin was born to Jewish parents in Brooklyn, New York. His father, Irving J. Chaykin (1912–2007), was born in Brooklyn, and was a professor of accountancy at City College of New York. His mother, Clarice Chaykin (née Bloomfield, 1921–2012), was born in Winnipeg, Manitoba, but raised in Montreal, Quebec, since the age of three. She graduated from Beth Israel Hospital nursing school in Newark, New Jersey. Chaykin's maternal uncle, George Bloomfield (1930–2011), was a veteran Canadian director, producer, writer and actor who directed Chaykin in a number of projects for film and television.

Raised in New York City, Chaykin studied drama at the University at Buffalo, The State University of New York. He subsequently moved to Toronto, Ontario, where he resided until his death. Chaykin's first marriage, to Canadian producer Ilana Frank, ended in divorce. He was subsequently married to Canadian actress Susannah Hoffmann, with whom he had one daughter, Rose. Best known for having played Jen Pringle in the Anne of Avonlea series, Hoffmann had a supporting role in a 2002 episode of the television series A Nero Wolfe Mystery, in which Chaykin starred.

Chaykin was a dual citizen of the United States and Canada.

Career
Chaykin was known for portrayals of blustery supporting characters. One of his rare leading roles was Nero Wolfe. Chaykin first played the legendary detective in The Golden Spiders: A Nero Wolfe Mystery (2000), an A&E telefilm adaptation of the 1953 novel by Rex Stout.  Timothy Hutton costarred in the production as Archie Goodwin. The New York Times reported Chaykin's "undisguised delight" at starring in the promotion for The Golden Spiders: "There's an extraordinary billboard up on Sunset Boulevard right now, with a humongous photograph of my face. ... I drive by it constantly, back and forth, back and forth." The original movie's success led to the weekly series, A Nero Wolfe Mystery, which played for two seasons on A&E and continues to air internationally. Chaykin and Hutton had worked together previously, albeit briefly, in the 1985 film Turk 182; and they worked together subsequently, in the 2006 film Heavens Fall.

Two of Chaykin's early motion picture roles brought him public recognition: computer programmer Jim Sting in WarGames and prosecution witness Sam Tipton in My Cousin Vinny. In 1990, he had a small but pivotal role in the film Dances with Wolves, portraying Major Fambrough, an Army fort commander who kills himself as a result of becoming insane.

Chaykin had his first starring role in Whale Music, a 1994 film in which he played a burned-out rock star, a character based largely on Brian Wilson. Chaykin was named Best Actor at the 15th Genie Awards for his portrayal.

Chaykin also had roles on the television series Seeing Things and Emily of New Moon as well as a recurring role as the intergalactic gourmand Nerus (a nod to Nero Wolfe) in Stargate SG-1.

Chaykin portrayed the colorful bookie Frank Perlin opposite Philip Seymour Hoffman's compulsive gambler Dan Mahowny in Owning Mahowny, a film that critic Roger Ebert named as one of the ten best of 2003. In 2006, Chaykin appeared in an episode of the Ken Finkleman miniseries At the Hotel and received a Gemini Award for best performance by an actor in a guest role. He had a semi-recurring role in the HBO series Entourage, as volatile movie producer Harvey Weingard, a send-up of the disgraced producer Harvey Weinstein. He also appeared as Stan Deane, father of Kevin Zegers' character Woody Deane, in the 2006 romantic comedy It's a Boy Girl Thing.

Chaykin starred as Sam Blecher, the owner of a family-run driving school in Winnipeg, in the first two seasons (2008–2010) of the Canadian comedy-drama television series Less Than Kind. The series received the 2010 Gemini Award for Best Comedy Program or Series.

"Sam is an out-of-control, good-hearted, big-hearted person who just can't quite get it right with his family," Chaykin told Q radio interviewer Jian Ghomeshi in April 2010. "He's full of love but he can't express it. But what he does express is anxiety, desperation, and the need to dominate, which is kind of pathetic." Asked whether he liked the character, Chaykin replied, "I love him. I do, I really do, and it's the same kind of love that a person has for family — where you see their foibles but at the same time you embrace them because they are a part of you. And Sam certainly is a part of me."

In 2011 Chaykin posthumously received the ACTRA Toronto Award for Outstanding Performance — Male for his performance as Sam Blecher in Less Than Kind. He had been nominated for the award in 2003, for his portrayal of Nero Wolfe.

Death
Maury Chaykin died in Toronto on July 27, 2010, his 61st birthday, from complications of a heart valve infection.

Works

Theatre
Select theatre credits for Maury Chaykin were part of his resumé at Edna Talent Management, Ltd.

Filmography

{| class="wikitable sortable"
|-
! Year
! Title
! Role
! class="unsortable" | Notes
|-
| 1975
| Me
| Oliver Jordan
|
|-
| 1978
| King of Kensington
| Unknown 
| Episode: "Polyfur"
|-
| 1980
| Jimmy B. and André
| Bruno
| TV movie
|-
| 1980
| Nothing Personal
| Kanook
| 
|-
| 1980
| Double Negative
| Rollins
|
|-
| 1980
| The Kidnapping of the President
| Harvey Cannon
|
|-
| 1981
| Death Hunt
| Clarence
|
|-
| 1981
| Just Jessie
| Joey Harper
| TV movie
|-
| 1981
| The July Group
| Harvey
| TV movie
|-
| 1982
| Soup for One
| Dr. Wexler
|
|-
| 1982
| Highpoint
| Falco
|
|-
| 1982–1986
| Seeing Things
| Randall Jackson
| 4 episodes
|-
| 1983
| ABC Weekend Special
| "Mousey"
| Episode: "Horatio Alger Updated: Frank and Fearless"
|-
| 1983
| Curtains
| Monty
|
|-
| 1983
| WarGames
| Jim Sting
|
|-
| 1983
| Of Unknown Origin
| Dan Errol
|
|-
| 1983
| American Playhouse
| Gondol
| Episodes: "Overdrawn at the Memory Bank"
|-
| 1984
| Harry & Son
| Lawrence
|
|-
| 1984
| The Guardian
| Rudy Simbro
| TV movie
|-
| 1984
| Hockey Night
| "Bum" Johnston
| TV movie
|-
| 1984
| Mrs. Soffel
| Guard Charlie Reynolds
|
|-
| 1985
| Turk 182
| Man In Wheelchair
|
|-
| 1985
| Def-Con 4
| Vinny
|
|-
| 1985
| In Like Flynn
| Williams
| TV movie
|-
| 1985
| Canada's Sweetheart: The Saga of Hal C. Banks
| Harold Chamberlain Banks
| TV movie
|-
| 1985
| The Suicide Murders
| Sid
| TV movie
|-
| 1986
| The Vindicator
| Burt Arthurs
|
|-
| 1986
| Act of Vengeance
| Claude Vealey
| TV movie
|-
| 1986
| Philip Marlowe, Private Eye
| Lieutenant Copernik
| Episode: "Red Wind"
|-
| 1986
| Adderly
| Russian Agent
| Episode: "Requiem"
|-
| 1986
| Meatballs III: Summer Job
| Huey, River Rat Leader
|
|-
| 1986
| Night Heat
| Mallory / Merle Marlowe
| 2 episodes
|-
| 1986
| Crime Story
| Steven Kordo
| Episode: "Crime Pays"
|-
| 1986
| Sharon, Lois & Bram's Elephant Show
| Fire Captain
| Episode: "There's an Elephant Stuck Up That Tree"
|-
| 1987
| The Bedroom Window
| Pool Player
|
|-
| 1987
| Wild Thing
| Jonathan Trask
|
|-
| 1987
| Nowhere to Hide
| Marchais
|
|-
| 1987
| Diamonds
| Murray Wolf
| Episode: "Here Comes the Bride"
|-
| 1987
| Hearts of Fire
| Charlie Kelso
|
|-
| 1987
| Caribe
| Captain Burdoch
|
|-
| 1987
| Race for the Bomb
| General Leslie Groves
| 2 episodes
|-
| 1987
| Future Block
| Unknown 
| Short, Voice
|-
| 1987
| Higher Education
| Guido
| Uncredited
|-
| 1988
| Stars and Bars
| Freeborn Gage
|
|-
| 1988
| Hot Paint
| Wilensky
| TV movie
|-
| 1988
| Iron Eagle II
| Sergeant Downs
|
|-
| 1988
| Twins
| Burt Klane
|
|-
| 1989
| The Twilight Zone
| James L. "Fats" Brown
| Episode: "A Game of Pool"
|-
| 1989
| Millennium
| Roger Keane
|
|-
| 1989
| Cold Comfort
| Floyd Lucas
|
|-
| 1989
| George's Island
| Mr. Droonfield
|
|-
| 1989
| Breaking In
| Vincent Tucci
|
|-
| 1990
| Where the Heart Is
| Harry
|
|-
| 1990
| Street Legal
| Ben Tochet
| 2 episodes
|-
| 1990
| Mr. Destiny
| Guzelman
|
|-
| 1990
| Dances with Wolves
| Major Fambrough
|
|-
| 1990
| Labor of Love
| Unknown 
| TV movie
|-
| 1991
| The Adjuster
| Bubba
|
|-
| 1991
| The Pianist
| Cody
|
|-
| 1991
| Montréal vu par...
| Jurgen Van Doom
| (segment "En passant")
|-
| 1991
| Conspiracy of Silence
| Lawyer D'Arcy Bancroft
| Episode: "Episode #1.1"
|-
| 1992
| My Cousin Vinny
| Sam Tipton
|
|-
| 1992
| Leaving Normal
| Leon "Crazy-As" Pendleton
|
|-
| 1992
| Buried on Sunday
| Dexter Lexcannon
|
|-
| 1992
| Hero
| Winston, Bernie's Landlord
|
|-
| 1992
| Split Images
| Walter Kouza
| TV movie
|-
| 1993
| Sommersby
| Lawyer Dawson
|
|-
| 1993
| Matrix
| Lionel Meeks / Charles Meeks
| 2 episodes
|-
| 1993
| Money for Nothing
| Vincente Goldoni
|
|-
| 1993
| Josh and S.A.M.
| Pizza Man
|
|-
| 1993
| Beethoven's 2nd
| Cliff Klamath
|
|-
| 1994
| Exotica
| Exotica Club Client
| Uncredited
|-
| 1994
| Whale Music
| Desmond Howl
| Genie Award
|-
| 1994
| Camilla
| Harold Cara
|
|-
| 1994
| Transplant
| Unknown 
|
|-
| 1995
| Unstrung Heroes
| Arthur Lidz
|
|-
| 1995
| Devil in a Blue Dress
| Matthew Terell
|
|-
| 1995
| Sugartime
| Tony Accardo
| TV movie
|-
| 1995
| Cutthroat Island
| John Reed
|
|-
| 1996
| If Looks Could Kill
| Dr. Richard Boggs
| TV movie
|-
| 1996
| Harriet the Spy
| Holiday Pageant Director
| Uncredited
|-
| 1997
| Keeping the Promise
| Ben Loomis
| TV movie
|-
| 1997
| La Femme Nikita
| Rudy
| Episode: "Innocent" — Gemini Award
|-
| 1997
| Love and Death on Long Island
| Irving Buckmuller
|
|-
| 1997
| The Sweet Hereafter
| Wendell Walker
|
|-
| 1997
| Gone Fishin'
| Kirk, The Waiter
| Uncredited
|-
| 1997
| Strip Search
| Tomas
|
|-
| 1997
| Northern Lights 
| Ben Rubadue
| TV movie
|-
| 1997
| Pale Saints
| The Pirate
|
|-
| 1997
| A Life Less Ordinary
| Tod Johnson
|
|-
| 1997
| Mouse Hunt
| Alexander Falko
|
|-
| 1997–1998
| Due South
| Pike / Jasper Gutman
| 2 episodes
|-
| 1998
| Tracey Takes On...
| Kurt Rasmussen
| Episode: "Marriage"
|-
| 1998
| Jerry and Tom
| Billy
|
|-
| 1998
| Emily of New Moon
| Lofty John
| Episode: "Paradise Lost"
|-
| 1998
| The Mask of Zorro
| Prison Warden
|
|-
| 1998
| Psi Factor: Chronicles of the Paranormal
| Dr. Bob Dalhousie
| Episode: "Harlequin"
|-
| 1998
| Death by Dawn
| Unknown 
|
|-
| 1999
| Lexx
| Pa Gollean
| 2 episodes
|-
| 1999
| Let the Devil Wear Black
| Bruce
|
|-
| 1999
| Entrapment
| Conrad Greene
|
|-
| 1999
| Touched
| Bert
|
|-
| 1999
| Jacob Two Two Meets the Hooded Fang
| Mr. Cooper / Louie Loser
|
|-
| 1999
| Mystery, Alaska
| Bailey Pruitt
|
|-
| 1999
| Made in Canada
| Captain McGee
| Episode: "For the Children"
|-
| 1999
| Joan of Arc
| Sir Robert de Baudricourt
| 3 episodes
|-
| 2000
| What's Cooking?
| Herbie Seelig
|
|-
| 2000
| The Golden Spiders: A Nero Wolfe Mystery
| Nero Wolfe
| TV movie
|-
| 2000
| The Art of War
| FBI Agent Frank Capella
|
|-
| 2001
| Bartleby
| Ernest
|
|-
| 2001
| Varian's War
| Marcello
| TV movie
|-
| 2001
| Plan B
| Donald Rossi
|
|-
| 2001
| On Their Knees
| Norman
|
|-
| 2001–2002
| A Nero Wolfe Mystery
| Nero Wolfe
| 20 episodes
|-
| 2001
| Bleacher Bums
| Billy, The Scorekeeper
| TV movie
|-
| 2002
| Crossed Over
| Ethan Lowry
| TV movie
|-
| 2002
| Past Perfect
| Chuck
|
|-
| 2002
| The Wet Season
| Uncle Rick
| Short
|-
| 2002
| Hostage
| The Kidnapper
| Segment for the BMW short film series The Hire
|-
| 2003
| Owning Mahowny
| Frank Perlin
|
|-
| 2003
| Tracey Ullman in the Trailer Tales
| Dan Weisman
| TV movie
|-
| 2003
| Andromeda
| Citizen Eight
| Episode: "Pieces of Eight"
|-
| 2004
| CSI: Crime Scene Investigation
| Joseph Greene / Joe Landers
| Episode: "No More Bets"
|-
| 2004
| Sugar
| Stanley
|
|-
| 2004
| The Eleventh Hour
| Dr. Jackson
| Episode: "The Revenge Specialist"
|-
| 2004
| Being Julia
| Walter Gibbs
|
|-
| 2004
| Intern Academy
| Dr. Roger "Tony" Toussant
|
|-
| 2004
| Wilby Wonderful
| Mayor Brent Fisher
|
|-
| 2004
| Sex Traffic
| Ernie Dwight
| 2 episodes
|-
| 2005
| Where the Truth Lies
| Sally Sanmarco
|
|-
| 2005
| The Hunt for the BTK Killer
| Robert Beattie
| TV movie
|-
| 2005–2006
| Stargate SG-1
| Nerus
| 2 episodes
|-
| 2005–2007
| Entourage
| Harvey Weingard
| 4 episodes
|-
| 2006
| Boston Legal
| Ryan Myerson
| Episode: "Live Big"
|-
| 2006
| At the Hotel'
| Jerry Mitchell
| Episode: "The Perfect Couple" — Gemini Award
|-
| 2006
| Trailer Park Boys| Chief of Police
| Episode: "Gimme My Fuckin Money or Randy's Dead"
|-
| 2006
| Eureka| Sheriff William Cobb
| Episode: "Pilot"
|-
| 2006
| Heavens Fall| Lyle Harris
|
|-
| 2006
| It's a Boy Girl Thing| Stan Deane
|
|-
| 2007
| Superstorm| Senator Wallace
| 3 episodes
|-
| 2007
| Elijah| Premier Howard Pawley
| TV movie
|-
| 2008
| Production Office| Shelly
|
|-
| 2008
| The Grift| Rusty
|
|-
| 2008
| Blindness| The Accountant
|
|-
| 2008
| Adoration| Passenger & Professor On-Line
|
|-
| 2008
| Glitch| Mr. Linkletter
| TV movie
|-
| 2008
| Bull| Roland Gow
|
|-
| 2008
| Murder on Her Mind| John Emory
| TV movie
|-
| 2008
| Hooked on Speedman| Dietrich Baum
|
|-
| 2008–2010
| Less Than Kind| Sam Blecher
| 26 episodesACTRA Toronto Award
|-
| 2009
| Cooking with Stella| H.E. Mr. Durand
|
|-
| 2009
| Abroad| Lord Oldenberg
| TV movie
|-
| 2010
| Barney's Version| John Emory
|
|-
| 2010
| Casino Jack| Anthony "Big Tony" Moscatiello
|
|-
| 2010
| The Drunk and On Drugs Happy Fun Time Hour| Doctor Funtime
| Episode: "Maury Chaykin Fucked Us" (final role)
|-
| 2011
| Conduct Unbecoming| Colonel Fox
| (posthumous release)
|}

Awards

1986, Nominee, Gemini AwardCanada's Sweetheart: The Saga of Hal C. BanksBest Performance by a Lead Actor in a Single Dramatic ProgramAcademy of Canadian Cinema and Television
1989, Nominee, Genie AwardIron Eagle IIBest Performance by an Actor in a Supporting RoleAcademy of Canadian Cinema and Television
1990, Nominee, Genie AwardCold ComfortBest Performance by an Actor in a Supporting RoleAcademy of Canadian Cinema and Television
1994, Winner, Genie AwardWhale MusicBest Performance by an Actor in a Leading RoleAcademy of Canadian Cinema and Television
1997, Winner, National Board of Review AwardThe Sweet HereafterBest Acting by an EnsembleNational Board of Review of Motion Pictures
1998, Winner, Gemini AwardLa Femme Nikita (episode "Innocent")Best Performance by an Actor in a Guest Role in a Dramatic SeriesAcademy of Canadian Cinema and Television

1998, Nominee, Gemini AwardEmily of New Moon (episode "Paradise Lost")Best Performance by an Actor in a Guest Role in a Dramatic SeriesAcademy of Canadian Cinema and Television
2003, Nominee, ACTRA Toronto AwardA Nero Wolfe MysteryOutstanding Performance – MaleAlliance of Canadian Cinema, Television and Radio Artists
2006, Winner, Gemini AwardAt the Hotel (episode "The Perfect Couple")Best Performance by an Actor in a Guest Role in a Dramatic SeriesAcademy of Canadian Cinema and Television
2009, Winner, Canadian Comedy AwardLess Than KindBest Performance by an Ensemble – Television The Canadian Comedy Foundation for Excellence
2010, Winner, Canadian Comedy AwardLess Than KindBest Performance by an Ensemble – Television The Canadian Comedy Foundation for Excellence
2011, Winner, ACTRA Toronto AwardLess Than Kind''Outstanding Performance – MaleAlliance of Canadian Cinema, Television and Radio Artists

References

External links
 
 
 

1949 births
2010 deaths
Canadian people of American-Jewish descent
American Ashkenazi Jews
Canadian Ashkenazi Jews
Male actors from New York City
Male actors from Toronto
American male film actors
Jewish American male actors
American emigrants to Canada
American male television actors
American male voice actors
Canadian male film actors
Jewish Canadian male actors
Canadian male television actors
Canadian male voice actors
Deaths from kidney failure
People from Brooklyn
University at Buffalo alumni
Nero Wolfe
Best Actor Genie and Canadian Screen Award winners
Canadian Comedy Award winners